Vilar Seco may refer to the following places in Portugal:

Vilar Seco (Nelas), a parish in the municipality of Nelas
Vilar Seco (Vimioso), a parish in the municipality of Vimioso
Vilar Seco de Lomba, a parish in the municipality of Vinhais